The third cabinet of Ion C. Brătianu ruled Romania from 11 July 1879 to 9 April 1881.

Ministers
The ministers of the cabinet were as follows:

President of the Council of Ministers:
Ion C. Brătianu (11 July 1879 - 9 April 1881)
Minister of the Interior: 
Mihail Kogălniceanu (11 July 1879 - 17 April 1880)
(interim) Ion C. Brătianu (17 April - 15 July 1880)
(interim) Anastase Stolojan (15 - 20 July 1880)
Alexandru Teriachiu (20 July 1880 - 9 April 1881)
Minister of Foreign Affairs: 
Vasile Boerescu (11 July 1879 - 9 April 1881)
Minister of Finance:
Dimitrie A. Sturdza (11 July 1879 - 16 February 1880)
(interim) Ion C. Brătianu (16 - 25 February 1880)
Ion Câmpineanu (25 February - 15 July 1880)
(interim) Ion C. Brătianu (15 July - 24 October 1880)
Ion C. Brătianu (24 October 1880 - 9 April 1881)
Minister of Justice:
Anastase Stolojan (11 July 1879 - 29 July 1880)
Dimitrie Gianni (29 July 1880 - 9 April 1881)
Minister of War:
Col. Dimitrie Lecca (11 July 1879 - 29 April 1880)
Gen. Gheorghe Slăniceanu (29 April 1880 - 9 April 1881)
Minister of Religious Affairs and Public Instruction:
Nicolae Crețulescu (11 July 1879 - 22 January 1880)
(interim) Vasile Boerescu (22 January - 20 July 1880)
Vasile Conta (20 July 1880 - 9 April 1881)
Minister of Public Works:
Ion C. Brătianu (11 July 1879 - 24 October 1880)
Col. Nicolae Dabija (24 October 1880 - 9 April 1881)

References

Cabinets of Romania
Cabinets established in 1879
Cabinets disestablished in 1881
1879 establishments in Romania
1881 disestablishments in Romania